Jarace Isaiah Walker (born September 4, 2003) is an American college basketball player for the Houston Cougars of the American Athletic Conference (AAC). He was a consensus five-star recruit and one of the top players in the 2022 class.

High school career
Walker attended Susquehannock High School in York County, Pennsylvania for his freshman year before transferring to IMG Academy in Bradenton, Florida. As a senior, he averaged 16.7 points, 8.2 rebounds and four assists per game. He was selected to play in the 2022 McDonalds All-American Game.

Recruiting
Walker was a consensus five-star recruit and one of the top players in the 2022 class, according to major recruiting services. On November 4, 2021, he committed to playing college basketball for Houston over offers from Alabama and Auburn.

References

External links
Houston Cougars bio
USA Basketball bio

2003 births
Living people
American men's basketball players
Basketball players from Baltimore
Houston Cougars men's basketball players
McDonald's High School All-Americans
Power forwards (basketball)